Bahar is a 1951 Hindi Black-and-white social guidance film written and directed by M. V. Raman. It was a remake of the 1949 South Indian film Vazhkai. The film starred Vyjayanthimala and Pandari Bai in their Bollywood debut, Karan Dewan in the lead with Pran, Om Prakash, Leela Mishra, Sunder, Tabassum, Indira Acharya and Chaman Puri, forming an ensemble cast. The film was produced by A. V. Meiyappan with his production company, AVM. The music was composed by S. D. Burman with lyrics provided by Rajendra Krishan, while the editing was done by K. Shankarand and M. V. Raman and the camera was handled by T. Muthuswamy. The story revolves around Lata, Daksh Garg and Malti.

Plot 
The story revolves around Lata, who lives a wealthy lifestyle with her parents and they would like her to marry the wealthy Shekhar; she initially approves of it. Shortly thereafter, she meets Vasant Kumar, they fall in love and marry. Heartbroken and angry, Shekhar starts to investigate Vasant's background. He finds out that Vasant's real name is Ashok, an editor for a magazine. What happens in Ashok's or Vasant Kumar's life?

Cast 

Male Cast
 Karan Dewan as Ashok / Vasant Kumar
 Pran as Shekhar
 Om Prakash as Chaudhary Govardhanlal Patwardhanlal
 Sunder as Lattu
 Chaman Puri
 Shyamlal
 Narbada Shankar
 Desraj
 Sambandam as Seeni
 Baby Ashok
 Baby Bobbal

Female Cast
 Vyjayanthimala as Lata
 Pandari Bai as Malti
 Tabassum as Shashi
 Leela Mishra as Malti's Mother
 Sope
 Indra Acharya
 Saroja as Laxmi
 Revathi

Crew 
 H. Shantaram as the Art director
 K. A. Rehman as the Costume designer
 E. I. Jeeva as the Audiographer
 Hiralal and K. N. Dandayuthapani as the Choreographers
 K. Kumar and R. N. Nagaraja Rao as the Still photographer
 P. N. Nambiar, Panchapagesan, T. Ramaswamy and Sudhir Kumar Dey as the Colour Consultants
 R. Rangaswamy as the Line producer
 S. P. Chellappa and T. K. Srinivasan as the Production controllers
 K. N. Kini as the make-up person
 S. L Narayan as the Assistant director
 P. L. Valliappan and V. R. Ratan as the Assistant cinematographers
 M. Alagappan as the Assistant art director
 C. D. Viswanathan, M. K. Balu and S. P. Ramanathan as the Assistant audiographers
 Somu as the Assistant make-up person

Production 
After his film Vazhkai was a runaway success at the box office where it completed 25 weeks of its theatrical run, A. V. Meiyappan planned to remake the film in Hindi with his company AVM Productions. For the lead female role, actress Vyjayanthimala was roped in, Vyjayanthimala, who has done the same role previously in the Tamil and Telugu versions was about to make her Bollywood debut through this film. She had also learned Hindi at the Hindi Prachar Sabha to dub her own voice for her character. For second female lead, popular South Indian actress Pandari Bai was approached, though earlier she was considered to enact the same role in the Tamil version, only to be rejected by A. V. Meiyappan because of her Kannada-tinged Tamil accent, who replaced her with actress M. S. Draupadi in that role. Pandari Bai was credited as Padmini in this film, as her name is too old-fashioned for Bollywood.

Soundtrack 

The film's soundtrack was composed by S. D. Burman, while the lyrics were penned by Rajendra Krishan. R.Sudarsanam of south was the associate music director. Almost all the songs were chartbusters and the album proved to be successful for music director S. D. Burman, who previously tasted success through Shabnam.

The album features Kishore Kumar's early hit song "Qasoor Aapka", and he later became one of the leading male playback singers in Bollywood.  Bahar is also one of the rare soundtracks where Burman uses Shamshad Begum as his main singer. Her voice for the song "Saiyan Dil Mein Aana Re" became a hit. "Saiyan Dil Mein Aana Re" was later remixed by Harry Anand for the album UMI 10 Vol 4.

Box office 

References

External links 
 
 Bahar profile at Upperstall.com

1950s Hindi-language films
1950s romantic comedy-drama films
1951 comedy-drama films
1951 films
Films directed by M. V. Raman
Films scored by S. D. Burman
Hindi remakes of Tamil films
Indian black-and-white films
Indian comedy-drama films
Indian romantic comedy-drama films